Les Trois-Châteaux is a commune in the Jura department of eastern France. The municipality was established on 1 April 2016 by the merger of the former communes of L'Aubépin, Chazelles and Nanc-lès-Saint-Amour (the seat). On 1 January 2019, the former commune Saint-Jean-d'Étreux was merged into Les Trois-Châteaux.

See also 
Communes of the Jura department

References 

Communes of Jura (department)